Silas Wheeler (March 7, 1752 or 1753 at Concord, Massachusetts – November 28, 1828 at Wheeler, New York) called "Captain", was a soldier in the army of the American Revolution, and the founder of the town of Wheeler, Steuben County, New York.

Revolutionary War
He was fought at the Battle of Bunker Hill, with the Rhode Island Brigade, and marched with Benedict Arnold from Cambridge to Quebec in 1775. Many starved to death along the way, and others deserted. After several days with no food, a group of Indians brought the small army a dog - he said it was the sweetest food he had ever eaten. In the Battle of Quebec he was captured by the British, and in prison he contracted smallpox. Wheeler became bald from the illness and remained permanently so. After his exchange, he returned to Rhode Island, and re-enlisted on a privateer. He was later captured on the high seas by the British and was sent to a prison at the naval base at Kinsale, Ireland. He was treated particularly harshly, for his participation in the Gaspee Affair in 1772. After a year and a half he was offered help from the Irish orator and patriot Henry Grattan, if he could escape. This he and two others did, and Grattan gave them passports, protection from impressment, and passage to Dunkirk, France, and thence to America.

After the war he moved his family to Albany County, New York, where he appears in the first U.S. Census, in 1790. He went ahead of his family in 1798 to Steuben County, where he founded the town of Wheeler, NY and resettled his family there in 1800.

Family life
Silas married Sarah Gardner (born in Rhode Island) and they had two daughters: Ruth, who married Nathan Rose, and Sarah, who married William Holmes. His son, Grattan Henry Wheeler, named for Silas' rescuer Henry Grattan, served as a U.S. Representative from New York.

References
 The Genealogical and Encyclopedic History of the Wheeler family in America, by Albert Gallatin Wheeler, published 1914 by The American College of Genealogy
 History of the settlement of Steuben County, N.Y., by Guy Humphrey McMaster
 Historical Gazetteer of Steuben County, New York, by Millard F. Roberts, 1891
 Landmarks of Steuben County, by Harlo Hakes, 1896

External links
  Gaspee virtual archives
  Haywood genealogy
 The Wheeler Family in America 

1753 births
1828 deaths
People of Massachusetts in the American Revolution
American Revolutionary War prisoners of war held by Great Britain
People from Concord, Massachusetts
American privateers
People from Wheeler, New York
American escapees
Escapees from British military detention
People of colonial Massachusetts